Izi mobil is a brand in Bosnian mobile communications market. It was owned by Slovenian Izi mobil group. 

It has its own numeration (067 XXX XXXX) and it is a prepaid product. It functions as a mobile virtual network operator (using m:tel).

External links 
 Izi mobile website (in Bosnian)

Telecommunications companies of Bosnia and Herzegovina
Mobile virtual network operators